Tabitha Wady (born 1 January 1976) is a British actress, known for playing receptionist Katrina Bullen in the BBC television soap opera Doctors and for her role as Gemma in Kevin & Perry Go Large.

Before her appearance in Doctors, she had played a leading role in the period drama series Berkeley Square.  In 2010 she played Ava Taylor in “Your Sudden Death Question”, S4:E3 of Lewis.

Filmography

References

External links
 

1976 births
Living people
People from Bath, Somerset
English television actresses
English soap opera actresses